Kadenia is a genus of flowering plants belonging to the family Apiaceae.

Its native range is Europe to Siberia and Northern China.

Species:
 Kadenia dubia (Schkuhr) Lavrova & V.N.Tikhom. 
 Kadenia salina (Turcz.) Lavrova & V.N.Tikhom.

References

Apioideae
Apioideae genera